Curbar Edge is a gritstone moorland escarpment above the village of Curbar, in Derbyshire, England and close to the villages of Baslow, Calver, and Froggatt. It is regarded as a significant location for rock climbing, both regionally and nationally, in terms of both the historical development of the sport and as the location of first ascents.

Geography

Location 

Curbar Edge is located in the Dark Peak, the area of the Peak District characterized by peat moorland and gritstone rock. The Edge is one of a long series of west-facing gritstone escarpments, collectively known as the Eastern Grit.  A short walk away from Curbar Edge is White Edge, which is visible east of the location.  The ground is uneven due to the presence of the Big Moor. In the same area of Curbar Edge is located Padly Gorge, on the A6187, close to Grindleford village, this area is recognised as a Site of Special Scientific Interest (SSSI). Another place of interest located near Curbar Edge is Linacre Reservoirs, built between 1855 and 1904, located in Chesterfield, Derbyshire.

Curbar Edge is situated between Sheffield and Manchester. Curbar Edge is located in the same area of smaller settlements as Chesterfield, Dronfield , Matlock , Staveley  and Buxton .

Etymology 
The name "Curbar" and the several names from which it is derived ("Cordeburg", "Cordesburwe", "Quordborough", "Cordborgh", "Corburg", "Coresburgh" and "Corber") have the same meaning: Corda's fortified place. The personal name "Corda" is uncertain, as there are several plausible origins for this name.

Flora and fauna 

Apart from shrubs such as guelder rose and mezereon, primrose, lily of the valley, cowslip and dog's mercury characterize this habitat.
A great number of birds such as dippers, robins, blackbirds, herons, pheasants, sparrows and great tit can be found there. Birds of prey, for example, barn owl, buzzard, kestrel, little owl are among the components of the biological food chain. 
On land other animals such as highland cattle or grouse define this area.

Deer rutting season 
The rutting season for deer is between the middle of September and the middle of November. These months are the most favorable to see the horned animal. The area to watch the deer rut is between Curbar Edge and White Edge.

Geology 

Exposures of the Chatsworth Grit and the Crawshaw Sandstone on the basis of the Pennine Lower Coal Measures can be found in Curbar Edge. Curbar Edge has been used as a BGS mapping training location. Curbar Edge is located in Derbyshire which was within the delta of a vast stream that deposited sand and dust across southern Britain. Thanks to currents and tides, muds deposited in deeper water became shales, and sands became gritstone.

Curbar Edge is made of gritstone, a rough granular rock that consists of small pebbles and angular-shaped grains.

The gritstone, of which the Edge is composed, is strong and affects landscaping. It tends to form the highest soils and consists of variable layers characterized by edges. Characteristic overhangs are formed when erosion undermines the underlying softer layers.  The particularly severe wind erosion in the extremely cold and dry conditions that prevailed in Derbyshire, where Curbar Edge is located, during the Last Glacial Period picked out the weaker layers and defined the sculptural features of the Edge.

An active process on the Edge today is the formation of the crenelations in pinnacles of gritstone. These are the deepest vertical flutes near the top of the exposed structure, which descend vertically regardless of the angle of the local layer, but gradually fade after .

History

Prehistory 

A range of prehistoric remains is located in the area around Curbar Edge. Ancient cairns exist to the east near Froggatt Edge and to the west in Stoke Flat West. The East Moors in Derbyshire also has one of the largest preserved prehistoric field systems, settlement sites, and ceremonial stone circles. These remains allowed archaeologists to be able to determine an occupation date from the Bronze Age.

On Curbar Edge is a round cairn that is dated to the Bronze Age. This cairn is a prehistoric funeral monument with a single burial placed inside, covered in a gritstone cist. It was discovered in 1913 by John Manners, 9th Duke of Rutland (1886–1940), the then owner of the land, and his gamekeeper, E. Peat. They made a partial excavation, in which process some archaeological information was disturbed, for example, the original height of the monument. The perimeter of the cairn remained undisturbed and archaeologists discovered fragments of a food vessel, a broken bronze knife, and a flint scraper. The cairn is a Scheduled monument, and also significant for its relationship to the adjacent Bronze Age field system.

Post Roman 

The Romans are believed to be the first to exploit the natural gritstone resources of Curbar Edge. Curbar Gap at the southern end of the edge is crossed by a Roman road, providing easy access for quarrying the local stone. The Curbar Edge quarries are one of 4 areas in Derbyshire where millstone was produced. The millstones from Derbyshire were used to produce grey flour which is the reason that they only were used to produce animal feeds. There are many assumed quarries around Derbyshire and Curbar Edge. Exact quarry locations are often unknown, as marks on the stones indicate that many were moved from the excavation sites and subsequently worked on nearby. A large number of these quarries occur near old routes for the transportation of millstones. The millstone production on Curbar Edge came to an end around the year 1811. Stone extraction from rocks was performed on a small scale and would lead to the manual perforation of the rock, then used to grind grain.

Towards the end of the 11th century, a group of traders began transporting the Cheshire "witches" salt from Northwich, Middlewich and Nantwich to the medieval trading towns of Yorkshire, Derbyshire, and Nottinghamshire.
Salt was used not only as a spice but also to preserve food. The Domesday Book illustrates the main routes for transporting salt, such as Salterway, Salter Hill, or Salter Ford. The journeys passing High Peak were too difficult for a man to do, so the salt was carried by packhorses along the paths of the steep hills. One of the viable routes, discovered in 1272, led to Buxton from Fairfield and through Saltersford. At this point, traders heading to Chesterfield had to climb the escarpment across the River Derwent to Curbar Gap to finally enter the market town via Saltergate.

Rock climbing

History 

Some of the earliest known climbing activity was by Peak District pioneer, Jim Puttrell and the Kyndwr Club. They are known to have attempted a very early climb on Curbar in the 1900s, finally ascended by Chapman and Thomsett of the Polaris Mountaineering club in 1948 and now called PMC/1.

The Valkyrie Club, with Joe Brown and Slim Sorrell, first visited in early 1948, resulting in the first ascents of routes including The Brain, and Bel Ami. Subsequent visits in the 1950s by this group led to their first ascents of the three cracks of Left Eliminate (originally known as 'the little crack on the left'), the Peapod and Right Eliminate (originally known as 'the Great Crack'). In 1975 Curbar Edge appeared in the first photographic guide for rock climbers in the Peak District.

In the 1980s and 1990s, many notable climbers achieved significant first ascents at Curbar, including Ron Fawcett (with Amnesia Arete); Johnny Dawes (with The End of the Affair, Slab and Crack, White Lines and Janus); Gary Gibson; John Allen (with Profit of Doom and Moon Crack); and, Mick Fowler (with Linden). In 2001 John Arran made the first ascent of the route Dr. Dolittle, graded E10 7a and still one of the hardest routes in Britain.

Routes

Curbar Edge is a major location for Rock climbing in the Peak District for the practice of both traditional rock climbing and Bouldering. There are no Sport climbing routes on the edge, due to local ethics and policies defined by bodies such as the British Mountaineering Council and the Peak District National Park. By 1999 there were over 150 different named rock climbing routes on Curbar Edge, in addition to a wide range of bouldering problem routes on the edge and adjacent boulders. The difficulty of routes range in traditional UK Grade (climbing) from Easy (E) to Extreme (E1 - E10), and include routes with some of the hardest technical traditional and bouldering grades in the world (including Doctor Dolittle, graded E10 7a, and Detox, graded V11). In July 2015, three routes at Curbar (Dr. Dolittle, The Zone, and Knockin' on Heavens Door) were ranked in the top 20 hardest traditional climbs in the UK.
Some examples of indicative climbs are (from the easiest to the hardest):

Guides

The rock climbing on Curbar Edge has been widely documented in journals, magazines, books, dedicated guidebooks, and websites. The Edge was omitted from the earliest Gritstone rock climbing guides, Laycock's Some Gritstone Climbs, published in 1913, and Fergus Graham's Recent Developments on Gritstone, published in 1924, due to access restrictions related to the neighboring grouse moors. Early climbs were originally published privately in the pages of climbing club journals.  These were collated in the Climbs on Gritstone series of regional guides, starting in the 1950s, notably in sections by Wilf White in 1951 in Climbs on Gritstone: Sheffield Area, and by White and Sorrell in 1957 in Further Developments in the Peak District.

The Edge is covered in a wide range of current publications. The British Mountaineering Council includes climbs on Curbar Edge in two current guidebooks: Froggatt to Black Rocks (2010) and On Peak Rock (revised edition, 2003). A selection of climbs are also included in a selective regional guide to the Eastern Edges. Bouldering problems on Curbar Edge are covered in a dedicated regional guide Peak Bouldering, by Williams and James.

Other activities

Grouse shooting
The area of Curbar Edge is unsettled because of the setting aside of this region within the nineteenth century, by giant estates, for grouse shooting.
Grouse hunting has been practiced in this area for centuries, but can now only take place in some areas not owned by the National Park Authority. Since 1981 sports shooting is not allowed on its properties, which correspond to 4-5% of the land. Driven grouse shooting requires gamekeepers and additional staff driving grouse towards places in which hunters are set. In walk-up grouse, shooting hunters move towards grouse. The National Park Authority is neither for nor against grouse shooting. The environment is affected by grouse moor management.  It can have a positive impact on supporting local economies and protecting the natural habitat. In opposition, intensive management can have a negative impact caused by burning inappropriate places or limitations in the reintroduction of species.

Walking

Curbar Gap 

The Curbar Gap is a short route leading to the view of Derwent Valley. The route measures  from the car park to the top, the closest facilities are Baslow and Calver. In ancient times, this Gap was a packhorse route subsequently it became a turnpike in 1759; for this reason is possible to see, close to the car park entry, a guide stoop made of stone.

Calver Village to Curbar Edge

The beginning of the walk is located next to the Derwent River, it is possible to get there by car, there is a parking lot close to Calver Primary School; and also by bus which goes from Buxton to Bakewell.

Froggatt, Curbar and White Edge 

This walk covers Curbar Edge, White Edge, and Froggatt Edge. It consists of a  loop around the three Peak District Edges. The starting point is at the National Trust car park, the walk keeps going firstly into Curbar Edge, secondly to Froggatt Edge and lastly to White Edge. From this point is possible to complete the loop by reaching the car park at Curbar.

Froggatt, Curbar and Baslow Edge 
The path reaches Froggatt Edge, Curbar Edge, and Baslow Edge, it also passes the villages of Curbar, Froggatt, Calver and Grindleford. The walk starts and ends at the National Trust car park. By following this path it is possible to see the Stoke Flat Circle, a prehistoric feature from the Bronze Age; the Big Moor; Derwent Valley Mills; River Derwent; Calver Hill, a rock-climbing point known as Eagle Stone which was used in the past to test the strength of men; the Calver Mill Gallery, Froggatt Wood and Grindleford church.

Cycling

Cycling climb
The path starts close to the All Saints' Church in the village of Curbar. The steepest uninterrupted mile is 10.7% and the steepest quarter mile is 12.1%. Curbar Edge also hosts the annual championship called the British University Cycling Championship.

Curbar Edge loop 
This route measures , and the time needed to complete it is one hour and nineteen minutes.

Curbar Gap 
This route is ranked 9682 globally and 305 in the United Kingdom.

Lady Canning's Bridleway 
This path includes some segments in which are forbidden to cycle, the first segment is located after  and measures ; the second segment is found after  and it measures .

Hang gliding 
Due to its particular conditions, Curbar Edge is a suitable Hang gliding and Paragliding location for expert pilots. The prevailing wind direction in this location is South-West (SW) and West-South-West (WSW), and the hang gliding site code is 8.010. The bottom landing is limited and it has to be checked before launching, there is only one existing bottom landing noticeable with an "L" sign. In the case of light winds it is possible to land right after the take off; in case of stronger winds landing on the moorland is recommended .

In literature

In poetry
Curbar Edge is cited in the title of the poem "Night On Curbar Edge" written by William Watson (poet). The poem is part of "The Yellow Book/Volume 1".

In art 
Curbar Edge has been painted by a local Derbyshire artist, Martin Davis. The painting was created in 2013, it is acrylic on canvas and it is made following the Impressionism movement.

In other literature
Several climbs on the edge have had dedicated essays on them published in anthologies, including Profit of Doom, Linden, Right Eliminate and Elder Crack

In film 
Curbar Edge is featured in several films, including:

Threads (1984)
The Big Issue (1996)
Hard Grit (1998)
Young James (2007)
Head Games (2007)
Grit Flick (2009)
Progression (2009)
Wide Boyz (2012)

Curiosities 

 The Bible Stones: carved stones with biblical references can be found between Curbar Gap and Curbar village. These were made in the 19th Century by Edwin Gregory, the mole catcher for the Duke of Devonshire, as a sign of gratitude after going through a serious illness. To find these stones, there is a telephone box on Curbar Hill, with a map of the route from the Bridge Inn to Curbar Gap including places of interest.
 Curbar Pinfold: is an enclosure built to contain stray animals that were found in the private properties of the inhabitants of Curbar. These animals were kept in the pinfold, at the expense of the owner, until a fine was paid. It is situated at only  from Curbar Edge, on the south side of Pinfold Hill up from the River Derwent, it was restored in 2010.
 Curbar Lockup: is a building dating from the 18th century, built around 1780. It was located in the corner of a field near the Cundy Graves northeast of Lane Farm. As a lockup, it is believed to have been used to hold prisoners in overnight custody while they were in transit to other prisons or court hearings. For example, during the English Civil War, before being transported to Sheffield Prison and Sheffield Assizes, Curbar lockup was used to guard the prisoners overnight. A recent rumor says that Curbar lockup was used as a pest house, which was a building owned by the municipality, on the edge of the villages, used to contain the plague patients, in which they remained until complete recovery or in case of death. This building, since the 19th century, was used as domestic accommodation. The last permanent residents of the house were a sailor named Francis Pelly and a deaf-mute named Ebenezer Barratt, known locally as Yebby. The house remained inhabited until shortly before the outbreak of the Second World War, in fact, it was declared uninhabitable in 1935. It stands out as a square-based structure made up of coursed rubble gritstone. The two-stored building presents on the southeast side square windows, on the northeast side a stack and a massive doorway on the southwest.
Curbar Shelters: built by local people, these stone shelters dating back to the 18th and 19th centuries can be found near Curbar Edge. They protected farmers and cattle, they appear as structures made up of randomly arranged stones placed near walls. They are now covered with vegetation.

Books 
Publications containing content about Curbar Edge:

Similar edges

See also

 List of places in Derbyshire
 Derbyshire Dome
 Millstone Grit
 Rock climbing in the Peak District
 Climbing History
 Peak District
 Curbar
 Joe Brown
 British Mountaineering Council
 William Watson (poet)
 River Derwent

Gallery

References

External links 
Peak District
Peak District National Park
Peak District Walks
English Heritage
Historic England
The British Mountaineering Council
UKC Logbook: Curbar Edge

Derbyshire
Geography of Derbyshire
Geology of Derbyshire
Natural regions of England
East Midlands
Peak District
Mountains and hills of the Peak District
Climbing areas of England